Tilde Kassay was an Italian film actress of the silent era.

Selected filmography
 Niniche (1918)
 The Race to the Throne (1919)
 Diana Sorel (1921)

References

Bibliography
 Goble, Alan. The Complete Index to Literary Sources in Film. Walter de Gruyter, 1999.

External links

Year of birth unknown
Year of death unknown
Italian film actresses
Actresses from Naples
20th-century deaths